Father, I'll Take Care of You is a 2016 South Korean television series starring Kim Jaewon, Park Eun-bin, Lee Tae-hwan, Lee Soo-kyung and others. It replaced The Flower in Prison and started airing on MBC TV on November 12, 2016 for 50 episodes.

Synopsis
After their four children become independent, an old couple (Hyung-sub and Jeong-ae) decide to live for themselves. But one day, their four children come back to them. The story in addition to depicting the relationship between the family members also focusses on the revenge planned by a new neighbour (Lee Hyun-woo) against Hyung-sub.

Director Lee Dae-young said of the series, "It will depict the confrontation between generations and siblings caused by the grown-up children cohabiting with their parents and the story of a family that overcomes those troubles with love and affection", including a romance of the younger characters. He added that the drama portrays current South Korean society where rising housing costs have encouraged young married couples to live with their parents.

Cast

Main Cast
Kim Jaewon as Lee Hyun-woo
Park Eun-bin as Oh Dong-hee/Bang Hyun-jeong
Lee Soo-kyung as Han Jeong-eun
Lee Tae-hwan as Han Seong-jun/Lee Sung-woo

Han's Family 
Kim Chang-wan as Han Hyung-sub
Kim Hye-ok as Moon Jeong-ae
Na Moon-hee as Hwang Mi-ok
Lee Seung-joon as Han Seong-hoon 
Hwang Dong-joo as Han Seong-sik
Kim Sun-young as Seo Hye-joo 
Shin Dong-mi as Kang Hee-sook 
Shin Ki-joon as Han Ji-hoon
Son Bo-seung as Han Chang-soo 
Lee Ye-won as Han Ah-in 
Yoon Mi-ra as Han Ae-ri
Kim Yong-rim as Oh Gui-boon
Seo Dong-woon as Seo Chul-min
Ko Seong-hyun as Ryu Myung-jin
Oh Yeon-ah as Han Jeong-hwa
Ahn Jeong-hoon as Kang Min-seok

Broadcasting Company Staff 
Lee Seul-bi as Bang Mi-joo 
Park Jin-soo as PD Kim

People Around Lee Hyun-woo
Jo Sun-mook as Jo Moo-gyum

Others
Go In-beom as Bang Gwang-jin

Ratings 
In the table below, the blue numbers represent the lowest ratings and the red numbers represent the highest ratings.

References

External links
  

Korean-language television shows
2016 in South Korean television
2017 in South Korean television
2016 South Korean television series debuts
2017 South Korean television series endings
MBC TV television dramas
MBC TV original programming
Television series by Samhwa Networks